Events from the year 1900 in Scotland.

Incumbents 

 Secretary for Scotland and Keeper of the Great Seal – Lord Balfour of Burleigh

Law officers 
 Lord Advocate – Andrew Murray
 Solicitor General for Scotland – Charles Dickson

Judiciary 
 Lord President of the Court of Session and Lord Justice General – Lord Blair Balfour
 Lord Justice Clerk – Lord Kingsburgh

Events 

 23 March –  enters excursion service on Loch Katrine.
 23 April–12 May – the Automobile Club of Great Britain stages a Thousand Mile Trial, a reliability motor rally over a circular route from London to Edinburgh and return.
 May – the Migdale Hoard of early Bronze Age jewellery is discovered near Bonar Bridge.
 September–November – Queen Victoria pays her last visit to Balmoral Castle.
 31 October – the United Free Church of Scotland is formed by union of the United Presbyterian Church of Scotland and the Free Church of Scotland.
 15 December – all three keepers of the Flannan Isles Lighthouse are drowned.
 21 December – Delting disaster: four fishing boats with 22 crew from the Shetland villages of Mossbank and Firth (in the parish of Delting) are lost in a storm.
 Charles Rennie Mackintosh designs the White Dining Room for Catherine Cranston's tearooms in Ingram Street, Glasgow.
 Margaret Barr Fulton begins work as the UK's first qualified occupational therapist at Aberdeen Royal Lunatic Asylum.
 Nordrach on Dee sanatorium at Banchory opens, the first such specialist establishment in Scotland for tuberculosis patients.

Births 
 6 February – Guy Warrack, conductor (died 1986)
 14 March – Margaret Kidd, lawyer (died 1989)
 29 March – Margaret Sinclair, nun (died 1925)
 29 May – David Maxwell Fyfe, 1st Earl of Kilmuir, lawyer and politician, Lord Chancellor (died 1967)
 17 June – Evelyn Irons, journalist, war correspondent (died 2000)
 30 June – James Stagg, meteorologist (died 1975)
 13 July – Bessie Watson, child suffragette and piper (died 1992)
 25 August – Isobel Hogg Kerr Beattie, architect (died 1970)
 9 October – Alastair Sim, character actor on stage and screen (died 1976)
 12 December – David Meiklejohn, international footballer (died 1959)
 Saira Elizabeth Luiza Shah, born Elizabeth Louise MacKenzie, writer as Morag Murray Abdullah (died 1960)

Deaths 
 15 May – Hercules Linton, shipbuilder (born 1837)
 30 May – Francis Moncreiff, international rugby union player and Scotland's first captain (born 1849)
 9 October – John Crichton-Stuart, 3rd Marquess of Bute, landowner (born 1847)

The arts
 Doric dialect poet Charles Murray publishes Hamewith, including "The Whistle".

See also 
 Timeline of Scottish history
 1900 in the United Kingdom

References 

 
1900s in Scotland